The Church of the Holy Trinity is a Roman Catholic church in Panevėžys, Lithuania. It was built in 1803 by the Piarists, along with a monastery and a college.

Gallery

References

Roman Catholic churches in Panevėžys
Roman Catholic churches completed in 1803
19th-century Roman Catholic church buildings in Lithuania
Classicism architecture in Lithuania
1803 establishments in the Russian Empire
Church buildings with domes